Julia Sawalha (born 9 September 1968) is an English actress who played Saffron "Saffy" Monsoon in the BBC sitcom Absolutely Fabulous. She is also known for her portrayal of Lynda Day, editor of the Junior Gazette, in Press Gang, as Hannah Greyshott in Second Thoughts, and its sequel series, Faith in the Future, Lydia Bennet in the 1995 television miniseries of Jane Austen's Pride and Prejudice, Georgina and Kid's vocal effects in Sheeep, Carla Borrego in Jonathan Creek, and Dorcas Lane in the BBC's costume drama Lark Rise to Candleford. Her film credits include, Buddy's Song (1991), The Wind in the Willows (1996), Chicken Run (2000), and Absolutely Fabulous: The Movie (2016).

Early life and education
Sawalha was born in Wandsworth, London on 9 September 1968, and is the daughter of Roberta Lane and actor Nadim Sawalha. Her father was born in Madaba, Jordan. She was named after her paternal grandmother, a businesswoman who had received an award from Queen Noor for enterprise. She is of Jordanian, English, and French Huguenot ancestry.

Sawalha was educated at the Theatre Arts School, a fee-paying independent school which is part of the Italia Conti Academy of Theatre Arts, based at the time in Clapham in south London, which she left at the age of fifteen.

Career

Sawalha made her debut in the 1982 BBC miniseries Fame Is the Spur, and in 1988 played a small role in Inspector Morse on the episode "Last Seen Wearing". She first gained attention for her starring role in the Bafta award-winning ITV teenage comedy-drama Press Gang, which ran from 1989 to 1993.

In 1992, she appeared in episode "Parade" (S2 E4) of Bottom as Veronica Head, a beautiful young barmaid at the Lamb and Flag, whom Richie tries to woo by boasting of his false adventures in the Falklands.

From 1991 to 1994, she starred in the ITV family comedy Second Thoughts and continued with her character, Hannah (Lynda Bellingham's daughter), in the British Comedy Award-winning Faith in the Future (1995–1998). In 1994, she played Mercy (Merry) Pecksniff in the BBC production of Martin Chuzzlewit.

From 1992 to 2012, Sawalha played strait-laced daughter Saffron "Saffy" Monsoon in the BBC sitcom Absolutely Fabulous alongside Jennifer Saunders and Joanna Lumley.

She appeared in the 1995 BBC adaptation of Jane Austen's Pride and Prejudice as Lydia Bennet, with Jennifer Ehle and Colin Firth.

From 1999 to 2000, she voiced Mouse in the HIT Entertainment/Grand Slamm Children's Films TV series Kipper.

She voiced Ginger in DreamWorks/Aardman Animations' Chicken Run (2000).

From 2000 to 2001, she voiced Georgina and provided Kid's vocal effects in the HIT Entertainment/Grand Slamm Children's Films TV series, Sheeep.

She also played "Dawn the Wise Man" in The Flint Street Nativity on Christmas Eve.

In 2000, she appeared as Janet, the Australian barmaid in the first series of the British sitcom Time Gentlemen Please. She also played the much put-upon PA to "Zak" in Argos TV adverts during 2002–2004, along with Richard E. Grant.

She joined actor Ioan Gruffudd in the TV adaptations of C. S. Forester's Horatio Hornblower novels, as the captain's wife Maria. The following year, she became Alan Davies's co-star in Jonathan Creek after Caroline Quentin left, appearing in a Christmas Special ("Satan's Chimney"). She returned for a series between 2003 and 2004.

In 2006, she participated in the third series of the genealogy documentary series Who Do You Think You Are? tracing her family's roots, which are Jordanian Bedouin on her father's side, and French Huguenot on her mother's. She also appeared in the pilot of BBC 1's A Taste of my Life presented by Nigel Slater.

After a two-year break, she was back on screen in May 2007, competing in the BBC dog training celebrity reality show The Underdog Show. She then returned to acting in two successive BBC costume dramas: as Jessie Brown in 2007 series Cranford, followed by Lark Rise to Candleford from 2008 through 2011.

She provided the voice acting for Sister Hannah (a.k.a. "Hammer"), a main character in the 2008 Xbox 360 video game Fable II.

In autumn 2014, Julia played the part of Jan Ward in BBC One's thriller miniseries Remember Me, featuring Michael Palin.

On 9 May 2015, she read the account of a member of the Women's Land Army at VE Day 70: A Party to Remember in Horse Guards Parade, London, which was broadcast live on BBC1.

In 2016, she appeared in an episode of Midsomer Murders and reprised her role as Saffron "Saffy" Monsoon in Absolutely Fabulous: The Movie.

In July 2020, she made a statement revealing Aardman Animations intended to recast her character in the upcoming sequel to Chicken Run, stating that she is now considered to sound too old, and commented "I have officially been plucked, stuffed & roasted". The decision was met with widespread criticism with some finding the decision ageist. She even released video clips online of her voicing the character again to prove her voice still sounded the same.

Personal life
She had a relationship with Dexter Fletcher whom she met on the set of Press Gang.

On 1 January 2004, tabloid newspapers reported that she had married Alan Davies, her co-star in the television series Jonathan Creek. Both she and Davies, who avoided discussing their private lives in public, denied this, and took legal action against the reports.

Filmography

Film

Television
{| class="wikitable"
|-
! Year
! Title
! Role
! Notes
|-
| 1981
| Keep It in the Family
| Walk-On
| UncreditedEpisode: "A Game of No Chance"
|-
| rowspan="3" | 1982
| Fame Is the Spur
| Amy
| Episode: "1.2"
|-
| Educating Marmalade
| Good Girl
| 4 episodes
|-
| The Pirates of Penzance
| Daughter
| UncreditedTelevision film
|-
| 1988
| Inspector Morse
| Rachel
| Episode: "Last Seen Wearing"
|-
| 1989–1993
| Press Gang
| Lynda Day/Young Katherine Hill
| 43 episodes RTS Television Award – Best Actor
|-
| 1990
| Spatz
| Chloe Fairbanks
| Episode: "The Sound of Muzak"
|-
| rowspan="2"| 1991
| El C.I.D.
| Trudy
| Episode: "Thursday's Child"
|-
| Casualty
| Nikki Watson
| Episode: "Living in Hope"
|-
| 1991–1994
| Second Thoughts
| Hannah Greyshott 
| 47 episodes
|-
| 1992
| Bottom
| Veronica Head
| Episode: "Parade"
|-
| 1992–2012
| Absolutely Fabulous
| Saffron 'Saffy' Monsoon
| 39 episodes
|-
| 1993
| Parallel 9
| Herself
| Episode: "Episode 2.5"
|-
| rowspan="3"| 1994
| Lovejoy
| Joanna Whymark
| Episode: "Double-Edged Sword"
|-
| Keeper
| Alison
| tv short
|-
| Martin Chuzzlewit
| Mercy Pecksniff
| 6 episodes
|-
| 1995
| Pride and Prejudice
| Lydia Bennet
| 6 episodesTV mini-series
|-
| 1995–1998
| Faith in the Future
| Hannah Greyshott 
| 22 episodes
|-
| rowspan="2"| 1996
| French and Saunders
| Herself
| Episode: "Baywatch"
|-
| Tales from the Crypt
| Teresa
| Episode: "The Kidnapper"
|-
| rowspan="3"| 1997
| McLibel!
| Helen Steel
| "Episode 1.1"TV mini-series
|-
| Ain't Misbehavin'''
| Dolly Nightingale
| 3 episodesTV mini-series
|-
| An Audience with the Spice Girls| Herself
| TV special
|-
| rowspan="2"| 1998
| Absolutely Fabulous: Absolutely Not!| Saffron 'Saffy' Monsoon
| video|-
| Light Lunch| Herself
| Episode: "The Future's Bright, the Future's Funny"
|-
| rowspan="4"| 1999
| Doctor Who: The Curse of Fatal Death| Emma
| Charity spoof TV movie by Comic Relief|-
| The Flint Street Nativity| Wise Man
| TV movie
|-
| The Nearly Complete and Utter History of Everything| Catherine Parr
| TV movie
|-
| Late Lunch| Herself
| Episode: "#2.14"
|-
| 1999–2000
| Kipper| Mouse (voice)
| 4 episodes
|-
| rowspan="7"| 2000
| Mirrorball| Freda Keill
| TV short|-
| The Hatching of 'Chicken Run'| Herself
| TV special
|-
| Poultry in Motion: The Making of Chicken Run| Herself
| TV special
|-
| HBO First Look| Herself
| Episode: "The Hatching of Chicken Run"
|-
| Stars in Their Eyes| Herself
| Episode: "Cerys Matthews"
|-
| Bob Martin| Herself
| Episode: "Through the Keyhole"
|-
| Masterchef| Herself
| Episode: "#10.14"
|-
| rowspan="2" | 2000–2001
| Time Gentlemen Please| Janet Wilson
| 21 episodes
|-
|Sheeep| Georgina (voice), Kid (various noises), Jaunita Luftfita (voice), Penny (voice), Princess Grazelightly (voice), Additional voices
| 26 episodes
|-
| 2001–2004
| Jonathan Creek| Carla Borrego
| 7 episodes
|-
| 2003
| Hornblower| Maria Mason/Hornblower
| TV movie
|-
| 2003–2004
| Comedy Connections| Narrator (voice)
| 14 episodes
|-
| rowspan="2" | 2004
| The Story of Absolutely Fabulous| Herself
| TV special
|-
| White Box| Saffron
| TV movie
|-
| rowspan="2" | 2006
| A Taste of My Life| Herself
| TV special
|-
| Who Do You Think You Are?| Herself
| Episode: "Julia Sawalha"
|-
| rowspan="3"| 2007
| Cranford| Jessie Brown
| 5 episodes
|-
| The Underdog Show| Herself
| Unknown episodes
|-
| The Graham Norton Show| Herself
| Episode: "#1.7"
|-
| 2008–2011
| Lark Rise to Candleford| Dorcas Lane
| 40 episodes
|-
| 2009
| The Alan Titchmarsh Show| Herself
| Episode: "9 March 2009"
|-
| 2013
| Agatha Christie's Marple| Mrs. Cresswell
| Episode: "Greenshaw's Folly"
|-
| 2014
| Remember Me| Jan Ward
| 3 episodes
|-
| 2016
| Midsomer Murders| Penny Henderson
| Episode: "Saints and Sinners"
|}

Video games

Theatre credits

References

External links

Julia Sawalha on Who Do You Think You Are?''

20th-century English actresses
21st-century English actresses
British comedy actresses
English child actresses
English film actresses
English people of French descent
English people of Jordanian descent
English television actresses
Alumni of the Italia Conti Academy of Theatre Arts
English voice actresses
Living people
1968 births
People from Wandsworth